The LXXXVIII Army Corps was an army corps of the German Wehrmacht during World War II. It was formed in 1942 and existed until 1945.

History 
The LXXXVIII Army Corps was formed on 8 June 1942 using personnel from the 240th Division. That staff had already effectively been a corps, as it had overseen the 82nd, 167th and 719th Divisions between April and June 1942. The initial corps commander of the LXXXVIII Army Corps was Hans-Wolfgang Reinhard.

Between June 1942 and July 1944, the commanding officer of the LXXXVIII Army Corps was also the commander of army troops in the Netherlands and staff for coastal defense of Wehrmacht commander Netherlands, but was merely responsible for the corps itself after that.

Structure

Noteworthy individuals 

 Hans-Wolfgang Reinhard, corps commander of the LXXXVIII Army Corps (1 July 1942 – 21 December 1944).
 Felix Schwalbe, corps commander of the LXXXVIII Army Corps (21 December 1944 – 3 April 1945).
 Johann Wolpert, corps commander of the LXXXVIII Army Corps (3 April 1945 – May 1945).

References 

Corps of Germany in World War II
Military units and formations established in 1942
Military units and formations disestablished in 1945